Rajendrasinh Ghanshyamsinh Rana (born 22 May 1956) is an Indian politician who was a member of the Lok Sabha, the lower house of Parliament of India, from 1996 to 2014.

He is the great grandson of S. R. Rana (1870–1957), who was an Indian political activist, founding member of the Paris Indian Society and the vice-president of the Indian Home Rule Society.

Political career
He represented the Bhavnagar constituency of Gujarat for five terms of the Parliament. He is a member of the Bharatiya Janata Party (BJP), and served as the President of the state unit of BJP from 1998 to 2006. He did not contest 2014 Indian general election.

References

External links
 Official biographical sketch in Parliament of India website

People from Gujarat
Bharatiya Janata Party politicians from Gujarat
1956 births
Living people
India MPs 2004–2009
India MPs 2009–2014
India MPs 1996–1997
India MPs 1998–1999
India MPs 1999–2004
Lok Sabha members from Gujarat
Rashtriya Swayamsevak Sangh members